Streptomyces atroolivaceus is a bacterium species from the genus Streptomyces which has been isolated from soil in Russia. Streptomyces atroolivaceus produces leinamycin, mithramycin and chromocyclomycin.

See also 
 List of Streptomyces species

References

Further reading

External links
Type strain of Streptomyces atroolivaceus at BacDive -  the Bacterial Diversity Metadatabase

atroolivaceus
Bacteria described in 1958